Bernd Klenke (born 19 September 1946 in Berlin) is a sailor from East-Germany, who represented his country at the 1980 Summer Olympics in Tallinn as crew member in the Soling. With helmsman Dieter Below and fellow crew member Michael Zachries they took the 4th place.

References

Living people
1946 births
Sailors at the 1980 Summer Olympics – Soling
Olympic sailors of East Germany
Sportspeople from Berlin
German male sailors (sport)